Laetitia Coryn (born 1984) is a French comic artist, illustrator and voice actor.

Biography 
At the age of fifteen, Coryn met the comic artist Jean-Claude Mézières, who inspired her to pursue a career in illustration. She went on to study at the École supérieure des arts et industries graphiques (ESAIG) in Paris and in 2009 she published her first comic book at Glénat Editions.

In 2016, Coryn collaborated with French psychiatrist and sexologist Philippe Brenot to publish Sex Story, a comic book about the cultural history of sex. It quickly became a bestseller in France and got translated into several other languages.

Works 
 Le monde merveilleux des vieux tome 1. Glenat, 2009, 
 Le monde merveilleux des vieux tome 2. Glenat, 2009, 
 Fenêtre sur cour d'école. Dargaud, 2014, 
 Le péril vieux. Dargaud, 2014,

Only as drawing artist 
with Pat Perna, Pat Ryu: La question de Dieu. 12 Bis, 2011, 
with Philippe Brenot, Isabelle Lebeau: Sex Story. Arenes, 2016, 
 Will McMorran (translator): The Story of Sex: From Apes to Robots. Penguin books, 2017, 
with Leïla Slimani, Sandra Desmazières: Paroles d'honneur. Arenes, 2017,

External links 
Laetitia Coryn's blogs
Laetitia Coryn's instagram page
Face-à-face avec Laetitia Coryn, auteure de BD et comédienne (interview (video, French): part 1, part 2, part 3, part 4)
Aïda Semlali: Laetitia Coryn: "Les jeunes au Maroc ont majoritairement soif de liberté en matière de sexualité" (ENTRETIEN). HuffPost Maroc, 16 September 2017 (French, archived)

References 

1984 births
Living people
21st-century French women writers